Craighead House may refer to:

in Canada
Craighead House, Vancouver, British Columbia, designed by Charles Edward Pratt

in New Zealand
Craighead, Timaru, the heritage-registered administration building of Craighead Diocesan School

in the United States

Craighead–Jackson House, Knoxville, Tennessee, NRHP-listed
Craighead House (Nashville, Tennessee), historic house with notable gardens